Thomas Henry Bond (April 2, 1856 – January 24, 1941) was a Major League Baseball player who was a star pitcher and a right fielder a total of ten seasons. A native of Granard, Ireland, he is the first man born in Ireland to play Major League Baseball. Bond was also the last survivor of the National League's first season (1876).

Early life
Tommy Bond was born on April 2, 1856, in Granard, Ireland, to an English father and Irish mother. The family migrated to Brooklyn, New York, in 1862, and Tommy played amateur and semiprofessional baseball there in the early 1870s.

Career
Bond played for six teams during his career: the Brooklyn Atlantics (1874), Hartford Dark Blues (1875–1876), Boston Red Caps (1877–1881), Worcester Ruby Legs (1882), Boston Reds (1884), and Indianapolis Hoosiers (1884). He also managed the Worcester team for six games.

On October 20 of his rookie year, he fell one out short of what would have been major league baseball's first no-hitter. Two years later, he was the losing pitcher in the first successful no-hitter, hurled by George Bradley on July 15, 1876.

During his 10-season career, he was a three-time 40-game winner, played for two National League pennant-winning clubs, and regularly finished in the top ten in many pitching categories. In 1877, he was the first winner of baseball's pitching Triple Crown, leading the NL in wins (40), earned run average (2.11), and strikeouts (170). His career statistics include a record of 234–163, 386 complete games in 408 starts, 42 shutouts, and an ERA of 2.31. Bond also played 92 games in the outfield, a few more in the infield, and batted .238 with 174 RBI and 213 runs scored. Bond currently holds the third-best strikeouts per walks rate in baseball history, at a 5.0363 ratio, for pitchers who threw a minimum 1,000 innings. Bond previously held the record for over 130 years, and as of 2018 still holds the record for retired pitchers.

Bond threw a fastball, curveball, and by the end of his career a spitball.

Later life and death
Bond married his wife, Louise, in 1879, and they had three children.

After retirement from pro baseball, Bond worked stints as an umpire in the National League, minor leagues, and college games. He also worked in his wife's family leather business and then for the city of Boston for decades.

Bond received a single Hall of Fame vote from the Veterans Committee's 1936 ballot.

Bond died the age of 84 in 1941 in Boston, Massachusetts, and is interred at Forest Hills Cemetery.

Honors
In the Irish Baseball League, the annual award for the best pitcher is named "The 'Tommy Bond' Best Pitcher Award."

See also
 List of Major League Baseball career wins leaders
 Major League Baseball Triple Crown
 List of Major League Baseball annual ERA leaders
 List of Major League Baseball annual strikeout leaders
 List of Major League Baseball annual wins leaders
 List of players from Ireland in Major League Baseball
 List of Major League Baseball player-managers
 Baseball awards#Ireland

References

External links

1856 births
1941 deaths
19th-century baseball players
Major League Baseball pitchers
Major League Baseball right fielders
Major League Baseball players from Ireland
Irish baseball players
National League Pitching Triple Crown winners
National League ERA champions
National League strikeout champions
National League wins champions
Boston Red Caps players
Boston Reds (UA) players
Brooklyn Atlantics players
Hartford Dark Blues players
Indianapolis Hoosiers (AA) players
Worcester Ruby Legs players
Worcester Worcesters managers
Sportspeople from County Longford
Brooklyn Atlantics (minor league) players
Memphis Reds players
Brockton (minor league baseball) players
Major League Baseball player-managers
Burials in Boston
Baseball coaches from Massachusetts
Baseball players from Boston
Irish emigrants to the United States (before 1923)